Ḷḷamas (Spanish: Llamas) is one of 18 parishes (administrative divisions) in Aller, a municipality within the province and autonomous community of Asturias, in northern Spain. 

Villages
 Cima la Viḷḷa
 Casqueyu
 Reboḷḷal
 La Plaza
 La Venta
 Carpienzo
 Cortadiḷḷu

References

Parishes in Aller